I Anti-Aircraft Corps (I AA Corps) was a high-level formation of Britain's Anti-Aircraft Command from 1940 to 1942. It defended Southern England and Wales during the Blitz and the middle years of the Second World War.

Origin
AA Command had been created in 1938 to control the Territorial Army's rapidly-expanding anti-aircraft (AA) organisation within Air Defence of Great Britain. On the outbreak of war in September 1939, it commanded seven AA Divisions, each with several AA Brigades, disposed around the United Kingdom. Continued expansion made this organisation unwieldy, so in November 1940 – during the Luftwaffe'''s nightly Blitz on London and other British cities – five further AA Divisions were organised, and all the divisions grouped under three corps headquarters directly subordinate to AA Command. The largest of these was I AA Corps, covering Southern England and South Wales, which by February 1941 comprised five AA divisions and 20 brigades. Its boundaries roughly coincided with No. 10 Group RAF and No. 11 Group RAF of RAF Fighter Command.Frederick, p. 1047.

Order of battle
I AA Corps had the following organisation from February 1941:Farndale,  Annex D, pp. 257–9.Order of Battle of Non-Field Force Units in the United Kingdom, Part 27: AA Command, 12 May 1941, The National Archives (TNA), Kew file WO 212/79.Order of Battle of Non-Field Force Units in the United Kingdom, Part 27: AA Command, 14 May 1942, with amendments, TNA file WO 212/81.

Corps HQ: Uxbridge

General Officer Commanding:Farndale, Annex J.
 Lieutenant-General S.R. Wason (11 November 1940 to 14 February 1942)
 Lieutenant-General C.A.E. Cadell (14 February 1942 to  30 September 1942)

1st AA DivisionBecame independent, directly under AA Command, during April 1942 26th (London) Anti-Aircraft Brigade (London Inner Artillery Zone)
 38th Light Anti-Aircraft Brigade (London Searchlight layout)
 48th Anti-Aircraft Brigade (London IAZ)
 49th Anti-Aircraft Brigade (London IAZ)

5th AA Division
 27th (Home Counties) Anti-Aircraft Brigade (Sector layout)
 35th Anti-Aircraft Brigade (Portsmouth)
 47th Anti-Aircraft Brigade (Sector layout)
 65th Anti-Aircraft Brigade (Southampton)

6th AA Division
 6th Anti-Aircraft Brigade (Essex airfields, sector layout)
 28th (Thames and Medway) Anti-Aircraft Brigade (Thames South, Chatham, Dover)
 29th (East Anglian) Anti-Aircraft Brigade (Sector layout)
 37th Anti-Aircraft Brigade (Thames North)
 56th Light Anti-Aircraft Brigade (Airfields, sector layout)

8th AA Division
 46th Anti-Aircraft Brigade (Bristol)
 55th Light Anti-Aircraft Brigade (Plymouth, Falmouth)
 60th Anti-Aircraft Brigade (Exeter, Yeovil, Portland)
 64th Anti-Aircraft Brigade (Airfields, sector layout)
 69th Anti-Aircraft Brigade joined in June 19419th AA Division
 5th Anti-Aircraft Brigade (Gloucester, Hereford)
 45th Anti-Aircraft Brigade (Cardiff, Newport)
 61st Anti-Aircraft Brigade (Swansea, Milford Haven)

Intermediate Ammunition Depots
 Fort Efford, Plymouth
 Black Park, near Uxbridge
 Takeley, near Bishop's Stortford
 Mereworth Woods, near Sevenoaks
 Castleton, Newport
 Bramley Central Ammunition Depot (controlled by War Office)

Equipment Ammunition Magazines
 Swansea
 Monmouth
 Burnett near Bristol
 Nothe Fort, Weymouth
 Fort Nelson, Fareham
 Tipner, Cosham
 Banstead, Surrey
 Chelsfield, Sevenoaks
 Mill Hill
 Purfleet, Essex
 Pitsea, Essex
 Warley, Essex
 Shoeburyness
 Hadleigh, Suffolk
 Chattenden, near Rochester, Kent
 Fort Horsted, Chatham, Kent
 Lydden, Dover
 East Penner, Pembroke
 Sheerness
 Ryde, Isle of Wight

Operations
As soon as it was organised, I AA Corps had to deal with the heaviest weight of the 1940–41 Blitz on London and cities such as Bristol, Cardiff, Plymouth, Portsmouth, Southampton and Swansea. It was responsible for the London Inner Artillery Zone and the Thames North and South AA belts, together with major Gun Defence Areas (GDAs) around Dover, the Solent, Plymouth, Bristol and South Wales, with 'Indicator Belts' and 'Killer Belts' of searchlights in between, the former working with the GDAs and RAF Sectors, the latter with the night fighters in the air. Redeployment was called for in 1942 when the Luftwaffe began the 'Baedeker raids' on cities such as Bath, Canterbury and Exeter, that had previously warranted little AA defence. Later, further redeployment, particularly of light AA guns, was necessary when the south coast towns of England were attacked by 'hit and run' raids, mainly by single-engined fighter-bombers, often evading radar detection, in what became known as the 'Battle of the Fringe Targets'. In August 1942 the 3rd AA Divisional HQ was moved south from Scotland to join I AA Corps and assist in controlling the large number of AA units brought by this redeployment. It was given control of  27th, 47th and 64th AA Bdes, but this lasted only for a short time.

Disbandment
The AA Corps and Divisional HQs were disbanded on 30 September 1942 and a replaced by a more flexible system of AA Groups, each aligned with a Group of RAF Fighter Command. The area covered by I AA Corps became the responsibility of three of the new groups: 1st AA Group (London) and 2nd AA Group (South East England) with 11 Group RAF, and 3rd AA Group (South West England and South Wales) with 10 Group RAF.Routledge, p. 401 & Map 36.

Notes

References

 Gen Sir Martin Farndale, History of the Royal Regiment of Artillery: The Years of Defeat: Europe and North Africa, 1939–1941, Woolwich: Royal Artillery Institution, 1988/London: Brasseys, 1996, .
 J.B.M. Frederick, Lineage Book of British Land Forces 1660–1978, Vol II, Wakefield, Microform Academic, 1984, .
 Brig N.W. Routledge, History of the Royal Regiment of Artillery: Anti-Aircraft Artillery 1914–55'', London: Royal Artillery Institution/Brassey's, 1994, 
 Sir Frederick Pile's despatch: "The Anti-Aircraft Defence of the United Kingdom from 28th July, 1939, to 15th April, 1945" London Gazette 18 December 1947

External sources
 British Military History
 Generals of World War II

Corps of the British Army in World War II
Air defence units and formations of the British Army
Military units and formations in London
Military units and formations in Uxbridge
Military units and formations established in 1940
Military units and formations disestablished in 1942
1940 establishments in England
1942 disestablishments in England